The Quabbin Aqueduct carries water from the Quabbin Reservoir to the Wachusett Reservoir. It is part of the Eastern Massachusetts public water supply system, maintained by the Massachusetts Water Resources Authority (MWRA). At  in length, it is one of the longest aqueduct tunnels in the world being  shorter than the Hetch Hetchy Aqueduct.

Physical characteristics 
Water from the  capacity Quabbin Reservoir flows through the Quabbin Aqueduct from the northeast side of the Quabbin, up a slope to the Ware River Diversion in South Barre, Massachusetts, down again to the Wachusett Reservoir, and then through a power station near the Oakdale section of West Boylston, Massachusetts. This upward and downward flow occurs by natural siphon action, with the high point in the siphon being at the Ware River Diversion.

Novelty 

Portions of the aqueduct follow the route of the Ware River Railway that was discontinued with the building of the Quabbin Reservoir. The siphon starts at the Ware River Diversion by feeding the river water into the aqueduct. If the aqueduct branch which travels to the Wachusett Reservoir (the Wachusett-Coldbrook branch) is closed, then Ware River water feeds into the Quabbin Reservoir for storage; however, if the Wachusett branch is open, then water flows into both the Quabbin and Wachusett Reservoirs. When the Wachusett branch begins to create sufficient suction as it fills, then the Ware River Diversion inlet is closed and water flows from the Quabbin to the Wachusett Reservoir as a natural siphon.

See also 

 Quabbin Reservoir
 Aqueduct (water supply)
 Tunnel
 Lists of tunnels

References 

Notes

Bibliography
 Federal order detailing the system and requiring changes, especially to water transport east of aqueduct, May 13, 1999.
 Metropolitan Boston's Water System History Massachusetts Water Resources Authority, accessed July 17, 2007.

Aqueducts in Massachusetts
Tunnels in Massachusetts
Transportation buildings and structures in Worcester County, Massachusetts
Tunnels completed in 1933
Water tunnels in the United States